Jomo Kenyatta University of Agriculture and Technology (JKUAT) is a public university that is situated in Juja, 36 kilometres northeast of Nairobi, along the Nairobi-Thika SuperHighway, off Exit 15. .It offers courses in Technology, Engineering, Science, Commerce, Management and Building sciences. The university has a strong research interest in the areas of biotechnology and engineering. Notable alumni include Dr. Paul Chepkwony, the first Governor of Kericho County in Kenya and a former lecturer, Emma Miloyo, a prominent Kenyan architect and the first female President of the Architectural Association of Kenya, as well as Aden Duale, the former Leader of Majority in the 11th Kenyan Parliament among others.

History 
The university was started in 1981 as Jomo Kenyatta College of Agriculture and Technology (JKCAT), a middle-level college by the government of Kenya with assistance from the Japanese government. Plans for the establishment of JKCAT started in 1977. In early 1978, the Kenyan president, Jomo Kenyatta, donated 200 hectares of farmland for the establishment of the college. The first group of students were admitted on 4 May 1981. The new president Daniel Arap Moi formally opened JKUAT on 17 March 1982.

The first graduation ceremony was held in April 1984 with diploma certificates presented to graduates in agricultural engineering, food technology and horticulture. On 1 September 1988, Moi declared JKUAT a constituent College of Kenyatta University through a legal notice, under the Kenyatta University Act (CAP 210C). The name of JKUAT officially changed to Jomo Kenyatta University College of Agriculture and Technology (JKUAT). It was finally established as a university through the JKUAT Act, 1994 and inaugurated on 7 December 1994.

In June 2019, the university graduated 118 PhDs, of whom 89 were from the College of Human Resource Development. The Commission for University Education said it would investigate allegations that rules on supervisor–student ratios and peer review had been breached.

Boards, Colleges, Faculties, Institutes, Schools and Campuses 

Jomo Kenyatta has the following campuses, schools, faculties, institutes and colleges:

Schools 
 School of Medicine (Main campus)
 School of Pharmacy (Main campus)
 School of Computing and Information Technology
 School of Architecture & Building Sciences
 School of Civil, Environmental and Geospatial Engineering
 School of Electrical, Electronic and Information Engineering
 School of Law (based at the Karen Campus)
 School of Mechanical, Manufacturing and Materials Engineering
 School of Biosystems and Environmental Engineering (SoBEE) - Main Campus
 School of Business
 School of Communication and Development Studies (SCDS)
School of Biomedical Sciences
School of Agriculture and Environmental Sciences.(SOAES)

Institutes 
 Institute of Energy & Environment Technology
 Institute for Biotechnology Research

Faculties, Campuses, Centres 
 Board of Postgraduate Studies
 College of Engineering and Technology
 College of Agriculture and Natural Resources 
 College of Pure and Applied Sciences
 College of Health Sciences
 College of Human Resource and Development
Main Campus — Juja
 Karen Campus
 Westlands Campus (formerly Nairobi Campus)
 Kigali Campus — (Kigali, Rwanda)
 Nairobi CBD Centre
 Mombasa CBD Centre
 Nakuru CBD Centre
 Kisii CBD Centre
 Kitale CBD Centre
 Kisumu CBD Centre
 Kakamega CBD Centre
 Eldoret CBD Centre
 Arusha Centre

Accommodation and catering

The university offers accommodation to some of the students at subsidized rates. There are six students' hostels inside the school compound, of which three are occupied by males and three by females. Halls 3, 5, 6 are occupied by males while Halls 1, 2 and 4 are occupied by females.

There are three student dining cafeterias: the Candle in the Wind, Main Mess and the Hall Six dining mess. The food prices are subsidized at the dining mess. Breakfast is served between 6.30-8.00am,Lunch 11am-2pm,Supper 5pm-8pm.

Library

The university has a library that has a seating capacity of 600 students and is stocked with 80,000 volumes. The library also offers other essential services like online services, reference, interlibrary loan, user education, orientation, online information services, photocopying, binding and repair. Some of the books available in the Library includes Season of Vipers by Tuti Danis Odongo.

Regional institutions 

In February 2010, JKUAT was selected as the host for the East and Central Africa regional institute of the Pan African University. The post-graduate Institute on Basic Sciences, Technology and Innovation would be hosted at the Main Campus in Juja, with the first students admitted in September 2011. The decision that Kenya would host the regional institute was made in July 2010 after a protracted dispute. JKUAT hosts the African Institute for Capacity Development (AICAD).

Hosts Pan African University
The Chinese government agreed to support the development of infrastructure, classrooms, hostels and laboratories at JKUAT based Pan African University, Institute of Basic Sciences, Technology and Innovation (PAUIST), an initiative by the African Union. The agreement was signed on 25 April 2012 between Kenya's Ministry of Higher Education, Science and Technology, represented by Bernard Malenga and JKUAT's vice-chancellor Mabel Imbuga, and an eight-person Chinese delegation led by Yin Youhua.

References

External links
 JKUAT

 JKUAT Alumni & International Students' Office

Jomo Kenyatta University of Agriculture and Technology
Education in Nairobi
Education in Central Province (Kenya)
Jomo Kenyatta
1994 establishments in Kenya
Educational institutions established in 1994